Gerald C. Carle (July 25, 1923 – April 12, 2014) was an American football, basketball, and baseball player and coach.  He was selected in the 30th round of the 1947 NFL Draft by the Green Bay Packers. He served as the head football coach at Colorado College from 1957 to 1989, compiling a record of 137–150–5.  He holds the program records for longest tenure, most wins, and most losses.  Carle died on April 12, 2014.

References

1923 births
2014 deaths
American men's basketball players
Colorado College Tigers baseball coaches
Colorado College Tigers football coaches
Iowa State Cyclones football coaches
Colorado College Tigers men's basketball coaches
Northwestern Wildcats football players
Northwestern Wildcats men's basketball players
People from North St. Paul, Minnesota
Coaches of American football from Minnesota
Players of American football from Minnesota
Baseball coaches from Minnesota
Basketball players from Minnesota
Basketball coaches from Minnesota